The 19th BRDC International Trophy was a non-championship Formula One race held at Silverstone on 29 April 1967.

Classification

Notes
Fastest lap: Graham Hill - 1:30.0

References

BRDC International Trophy
BRDC International Trophy
BRDC
BRDC International Trophy